Turner Falls is a waterfall on Honey Creek in the Arbuckle Mountains of south-central Oklahoma, United States,  south of Davis.

Turner Falls and the blue hole are dangerous and have claimed people's lives every year. Only experienced swimmers should swim there.

History
Mazeppa Thomas Turner, a Scottish immigrant farmer who married Laura Johnson, a Chickasaw woman, settled in the area in 1878 and discovered the falls. The falls were named for him.

Recreational use began in or before 1868.  At the time, Turner Falls was located in Pickens County, Chickasaw Nation.

Today, the falls are part of Turner Falls Park, a city park operated by the city of Davis, Oklahoma. The Falls cascade into a natural swimming pool, one of two such pools within the park, and these are popular tourist destinations in the summer.

The city of Davis acquired the park in 1919 and operated it until 1950. It then leased the facility to other interests until 1978, when it resumed control.

It also has a walk-in castle, originally built in the 1930s as a summer home for Dr. Ellsworth Collings, a professor and later Dean of the School of Education at the University of Oklahoma.

References

External links

Official website
Turner Falls Park

Protected areas of Murray County, Oklahoma
Waterfalls of Oklahoma
Parks in Oklahoma
Landforms of Murray County, Oklahoma